Route 293 is 67 km two-lane north/south highway located in the Bas-Saint-Laurent region of Quebec, Canada. The route starts in Trois-Pistoles at the junction of Route 132 and ends north of Cabano at the junction of Route 232.

Towns along Route 293

 Trois-Pistoles
 Notre-Dame-des-Neiges
 Saint-Jean-de-Dieu
 Saint-Cyprien

See also
 List of Quebec provincial highways

References

External links  
 Provincial Route Map (Courtesy of the Quebec Ministry of Transportation) 
 Route 293 on Google Maps

293